Jeremiah "A.J." Hendy (born April 8, 1993) is an American football safety for the Houston Roughnecks of the XFL. He played college football at Maryland, and signed as an undrafted free agent by the Miami Dolphins in 2016.

High school career
Hendy attended Bowie High School. While there, he played on offense, defense, and special teams for the football team. As a junior, he recorded 41 receptions for 464 yards and seven touchdowns. He was named overall Most Valuable Player (MVP), and won the Combine King and Fastest Man awards at the Baltimore Combine. He was also a two-time state high jump champion. As a senior, he recorded 592 receiving yards and seven touchdowns. He also recorded 30 tackles and five interceptions. As well as three punt returns for touchdowns. He was a team captain, and a 2010 second-team Big School All-State selection. He was rated as the 32 overall cornerback in the nation by Rivals.com, as well as the eighth overall player in Maryland. SuperPrep ranked him 12th in the Mid-Atlantic 49. He was ranked as the 87th best athlete in the nation by Scouts, Inc. and the 62nd wide receiver by Scout.com. He was recruited by Maryland, Iowa, North Carolina State, and Virginia.

College career
Hendy then attended the University of Maryland, majoring in criminology and criminal justice. As a true freshman in 2011, he became only the second true freshman to start a safety since 1993. That season, he appeared in nine games (three starts). He recorded 30 tackles (20 solo.), one tackle-for-loss, one interception, one pass defensed, and one fumble recovery. In 2012, as a sophomore, he appeared in eight games. He recorded four tackles for the season. As a junior in 2013, he appeared in 12 games. He recorded 32 tackles (20 solo.), one tackle-for-loss, one interception, two passes defensed, and two fumble recoveries. In 2014, he redshirt the season. As a redshirt senior in 2015, he started all 12 games. He recorded 76 tackles (48 solo.), one tackle-for-loss, four passes defensed, and one fumble recovery.

Professional career

Miami Dolphins
After going undrafted in the 2016 NFL Draft, Hendy signed with the Miami Dolphins on May 6, 2016.He recorded an interception in his first preseason appearance against the New York Giants. He was released during final cuts on September 3, 2016. On September 5, he was signed to the Dolphins' practice squad. On December 28, he was promoted to the Dolphins' active roster. He made his professional debut during Week 17 against the New England Patriots, playing special teams.

On September 2, 2017, Hendy was waived by the Dolphins.

Los Angeles Chargers
On October 11, 2017, Hendy was signed to the Los Angeles Chargers' practice squad. He signed a reserve/future contract with the Chargers on January 1, 2018.

On September 1, 2018, Hendy was waived by the Chargers and was signed to the practice squad the next day.

Houston Texans
On January 2, 2019, Hendy was signed by the Houston Texans off the Chargers practice squad. He was waived on July 27, 2019. A week later, on August 3, 2019, Houston re-signed Hendy.  On August 30, 2019, Hendy was released.

New York Guardians
Hendy was selected by the New York Guardians in the 2020 XFL Supplemental Draft on November 22, 2019. He was named Co-Defensive Captain. He had his contract terminated when the league suspended operations on April 10, 2020.

Saskatchewan Roughriders
Hendy signed with the Saskatchewan Roughriders of the CFL on May 4, 2020. After the CFL canceled the 2020 season due to the COVID-19 pandemic, Hendy chose to opt-out of his contract with the Roughriders on August 31, 2020. He opted back in to his contract with the Roughriders on December 21, 2020. He was placed on the suspended list on May 20, 2021, and reinstated on July 3. Hendy played in 14 games for the Riders during the 2021 season, contributing with 14 defensive tackles, seven special teams tackles and one interception. Hendy re-signed with the Riders on March 28, 2022. He was cut after training camp in June 2022.

Houston Roughnecks 
On November 17, 2022, Hendy was drafted by the Houston Roughnecks of the XFL.

References

External links
 Maryland Terrapins bio
 Miami Dolphins bio

Living people
1993 births
American football safeties
African-American players of American football
People from Gaithersburg, Maryland
Players of American football from Maryland
Sportspeople from Montgomery County, Maryland
Maryland Terrapins football players
Miami Dolphins players
Los Angeles Chargers players
Houston Texans players
New York Guardians players
Saskatchewan Roughriders players
The Spring League players
Houston Roughnecks players
21st-century African-American sportspeople